Hippotion moorei is a moth of the family Sphingidae. It is known from dry areas from northern Tanzania to Ethiopia and Somalia.

References

 Pinhey, E. (1962): Hawk Moths of Central and Southern Africa. Longmans Southern Africa, Cape Town.

Hippotion
Moths described in 1926
Moths of Africa